Jane Howard may refer to:

Jane Howard, Countess of Westmorland (1533–1593), English noblewoman
Jane Howard, Duchess of Norfolk (1643–1693), English noblewoman
Jane Howard (fl. 1920s), American classic female blues singer also (possibly) known as Miss Frankie.
Elizabeth Jane Howard (1923–2014), British novelist
Jane Howard (journalist) (1935–1996), American writer and journalist
Jane Howard (Australian journalist), deputy chair of Writers SA, South Australia

See also
Jan Howard (born 1929), American singer